Hebron is a town in Jefferson County, Wisconsin, United States. The population was 1,043 at the 2020 census. The census-designated place of Hebron is located in the town.

Geography
According to the United States Census Bureau, the town has a total area of 28.9 square miles (75.0 km2), of which 28.9 square miles (74.7 km2) is land and 0.1 square miles (0.3 km2), or 0.35%, is water.

Demographics

As of the census of 2000, there were 1,135 people, 391 households, and 303 families residing in the town. The population density was 39.3 people per square mile (15.2/km2). There were 410 housing units at an average density of 14.2 per square mile (5.5/km2). The racial makeup of the town was 98.68% White, 0.18% Black or African American, 0.53% Native American, 0.09% Asian, 0.09% from other races, and 0.44% from two or more races. 2.38% of the population were Hispanic or Latino of any race.

There were 391 households, out of which 39.9% had children under the age of 18 living with them, 67.8% were married couples living together, 5.9% had a female householder with no husband present, and 22.3% were non-families. 17.9% of all households were made up of individuals, and 7.2% had someone living alone who was 65 years of age or older. The average household size was 2.86 and the average family size was 3.24.

In the town, the population was spread out, with 28.7% under the age of 18, 6.9% from 18 to 24, 30.5% from 25 to 44, 24.5% from 45 to 64, and 9.4% who were 65 years of age or older. The median age was 37 years. For every 100 females, there were 98.4 males. For every 100 females age 18 and over, there were 97.8 males.

The median income for a household in the town was $53,929, and the median income for a family was $53,750. Males had a median income of $33,594 versus $23,750 for females. The per capita income for the town was $20,516. About 1.6% of families and 3.5% of the population were below the poverty line, including 0.7% of those under age 18 and 3.7% of those age 65 or over.

Notable people

 Jonas Folts, farmer and legislator, lived in the town

References

Towns in Jefferson County, Wisconsin
Towns in Wisconsin